Union for the Republic may refer to various political parties:

 Union for the Republic (Burkina Faso)
 Union for the Republic (Congo)
 Union for the Republic (Italy)
 Union for the Republic (Mauritania)
 Union for the Republic (San Marino)
 Union for the Republic (Togo)
 Union for the Republic – National Movement, a political party of the Democratic Republic of the Congo